Paulina Agata Brzeźna-Bentkowska (née Brzeźna; born 10 September 1981) is a Polish former road racing cyclist, who competed between 2003 and 2017. She is a part-team owner of UCI Women's Continental Team  with her husband, former professional cyclist Paweł Bentkowski, and also acts as a directeur sportif for the team.

During her career, Brzeźna-Bentkowska specialised as an all-rounder, with good climbing performances. She placed high overall and won stages in stage races such as the Tour de Feminin-O cenu Českého Švýcarska and Gracia–Orlová, winning the general classification of the latter in 2014. She competed at the 2008 Summer Olympics, taking 8th place in the elite women road race and marking the most successful result in the history of Polish women's cycling at the time. She won the Polish National Road Race Championships twice, and finished in the top-ten placings in the road race at the 2012 UCI Road World Championships.

Personal life
As well as her husband, Brzeźna-Bentkowska's uncle Jan Brzeźny and sister Monika Brzeźna have competed professionally in cycling.

Major results

1998
 3rd Road race, National Road Championships
1999
 3rd Road race, National Road Championships
2001
 3rd Road race, National Road Championships
2002
 3rd Road race, National Road Championships
2003
 National Road Championships
2nd Road race
3rd Time trial
 8th Trofeo Alfredo Binda-Comune di Cittiglio
2004
 2nd Road race, National Road Championships
2005
 1st  Road race, National Road Championships
2006
 National Road Championships
2nd Road race
3rd Time trial
 4th Sparkassen Giro
 6th Overall Tour Féminin en Limousin
 8th Overall Tour de Feminin – Krásná Lípa
2007
 6th GP Stad Roeselare
2008
 National Road Championships
1st  Road race
2nd Time trial
 4th Overall Tour Féminin en Limousin
1st Stage 2
 8th Road race, Summer Olympics
2009
 National Road Championships
2nd Time trial
3rd Road race
2010
 2nd Time trial, National Road Championships
2011
 2nd Road race, National Road Championships
 6th Overall Tour de Feminin-O cenu Českého Švýcarska
 7th Overall Gracia–Orlová
2012
 2nd Road race, National Road Championships
 8th Overall Tour de Bretagne Féminin
 10th Road race, UCI Road World Championships
2013
 1st Stage 3 Gracia–Orlová
 National Road Championships
2nd Road race
3rd Time trial
 5th Overall Tour de Feminin-O cenu Českého Švýcarska
1st Mountains classification
1st Stage 1
2014
 1st  Overall Gracia-Orlová
1st Stages 1 & 3
2015
 3rd Road race, National Road Championships
 5th Overall Auensteiner–Radsporttage
 7th Overall Tour de Feminin-O cenu Českého Švýcarska
1st Stage 1
2016
 8th Durango-Durango Emakumeen Saria
 9th Overall Tour de Feminin-O cenu Českého Švýcarska

References

External links
 

Cyclists at the 2008 Summer Olympics
Olympic cyclists of Poland
Polish female cyclists
1981 births
Living people
People from Środa Śląska
Sportspeople from Lower Silesian Voivodeship